Waterloo Strikers is a Sierra Leonean football club based in Waterloo, a suburb of Freetown, Sierra Leone. The club currently plays in the Sierra Leone National First Division, the second top football league in Sierra Leone.

External links
http://www.rsssf.com/tabless/sier07.html

Football clubs in Sierra Leone